Jonavos Jeronimo Ralio gimnazija is a public gymnasium in Jonava, Lithuania. It was founded in 1941 and includes grades 9–12. The gymnasium's anthem was changed several times because of politic structure changes in Lithuania. The current anthem was recognized in 2011.

Headmasters
1988-2019 Arūnas Rimkus (b. 1960)
From 2020.01.02 Zita Gudonavičienė

Notable alumni
Artūras Zuokas ( b. 1968), entrepreneur and politician, former Mayor of Vilnius
Darius Maskoliūnas (b. 1971), basketball coach and former player,  politician
Julius Sabatauskas (b. 1958), politician, member of Seimas
Eugenijus Sabutis (b. 1975),  politician, Mayor of Jonava (since 2016)

References

External links

Official Website

Schools in Jonava
Educational institutions established in 1941
Gymnasiums in Lithuania
1941 establishments in the Soviet Union